Paraclione is a genus of "sea angels", small floating sea slugs, pelagic marine opisthobranch gastropod mollusks.

They are very small and gelatinous, mostly transparent, and they only have a shell during their embryonic stage. They can be found in the Atlantic Ocean.

Species 
Species in the genus Paraclione include:
Paraclione flavescens Gegenbaur, 1855  (synonyms : Clionina aurantiaca  Franc, 1951  ; Clionina flavescens  Franc, 1951 )
Paraclione longicaudata Souleyet, 1852  (synonyms : Clio longicaudata Souleyet, 1851 ; Clionina longicaudata Souleyet, 1851)

See also
Sea angel

References

Souleyet. 1851. Ordre des Ptéropodes. Journal de Conchyliologie 2: 28-38
Gofas, S.; Le Renard, J.; Bouchet, P. (2001). Mollusca, in: Costello, M.J. et al. (Ed.) (2001). European register of marine species: a check-list of the marine species in Europe and a bibliography of guides to their identification. Collection Patrimoines Naturels, 50: pp. 180–213
Rolán, E., 2005. Malacological Fauna From The Cape Verde Archipelago. Part 1, Polyplacophora and Gastropoda
Vaught, K.C. (1989). A classification of the living Mollusca. American Malacologists: Melbourne, FL (USA). . XII, p. 195

External links 
Description of Paraclione flavescens
Description of Paraclione longicaudata

Clionidae